The Memorial Art Gallery is a civic art museum in Rochester, New York. Founded in 1913, it is part of the University of Rochester and occupies the southern half of the University's former Prince Street campus.  It is a focal point of fine arts activity in the region and hosts the biennial Rochester-Finger Lakes Exhibition and the annual Clothesline Festival.

History
The Gallery is a memorial to James George Averell, a grandson of Hiram Sibley.  After Averell died at age 26, his mother, Emily Sibley Watson, spent several years seeking a way to publicly commemorate him.  Meanwhile, Rush Rhees, president of the University of Rochester, had been looking for benefactors to help him add to the University's campus, then located on Prince Street in the City of Rochester.  Rhees included a dedicated art gallery on a map of the campus as early as 1905.  The Rochester Art Club, which was the focal point for art enthusiasts of the area and which had exhibited and taught at art venues of the time (Reynolds Arcade, the Bevier Memorial Building, and the Powers Block) supported the creation of the gallery.  Since its establishment in 1912 the Gallery has existed as a department of the University with an independent board overseeing its collections and programs.  Rush Rhees assembled the initial board of managers, including the Art Club's president, George L. Herdle, in November 1912 and by the eighth of the following October, presided over the Gallery's opening.

The inaugural exhibition, curated by George Herdle, consisted of contemporary American paintings, many of which were for sale, on loan from the artists or their dealers.  Since the Gallery had no endowment for acquisitions in its first decades, exhibitions were an opportunity for donors to acquire works and then immediately gift their purchases to the gallery to start its permanent collection. Significant early gifts acquired from exhibitions included: Willard Metcalf's [Golden Carnival], Joaquín Sorolla's [Oxen on the Beach] and Paul Dougherty's [Coast of Cornwall, near St. Ives].

George Herdle organized an ambitious exhibition schedule with multiple exhibitions changing monthly. Significant early exhibitions included the 1914 exhibition at which the original Kodachrome two-color process was introduced, and in 1919 a controversial solo exhibition by George Bellows.  Annual exhibitions of the Rochester Art Club were also held at the Gallery. In the early years, these changing exhibitions were supplemented by summer loan exhibitions from the private collections of George Eastman, the Sibleys, the Watsons, and other prominent Rochester families.  With Herdle's untimely death in 1922, his daughter and University of Rochester graduate, Gertrude L. Herdle began what would become a 40-year career as the museum's director.  Another daughter, Isabel C. Herdle, served in various curatorial roles beginning in 1932 after schooling at the University of Rochester, with graduate work at Radcliffe College and Paul Sachs' museum studies course at the Fogg, the Courtauld Institute of Art, and the Royal Institute of Technology in Stockholm.  Before joining her sister at the Memorial Art Gallery, Isabel Herdle worked for one year at the de Young museum.

Today, the Gallery is supported primarily by its membership, the University of Rochester, and public funds from Monroe County and the New York State Council on the Arts.

Collections

The Gallery's permanent collection comprises some 12,000 objects, including works by Monet, Cézanne, Matisse, Homer and Cassatt. Contemporary masters in the collection include Wendell Castle, Albert Paley and Helen Frankenthaler.  Other notable works include:

George Eastman's collection of about 60 Old Master, British, Dutch, American, and French Barbizon School paintings, including Rembrandt's [Portrait of a Young Man in an Armchair]
The Encyclopedia Britannica collection of twentieth-century American art
The Charles Rand Penney collection
Jean-Léon Gérôme's [Interior of a Mosque], the only painting from Hiram Sibley's original collection still in the Gallery's possession
Egyptian and Eastern Mediterranean antiquities from the collection of Herbert Ocumpaugh, a 19th-century businessman
Near East antiquities from the collection of Frederic Grinnell Morgan of Aurora, NY
English and Continental silver from the 17th through 19th centuries from the collection of Ernest Woodward, heir to the Jell-O fortune
El Greco's [The Apparition of the Virgin to St. Hyacinth], first work to be acquired from the Gallery's Marion Stratton Gould endowment
Portrait of Colonel Nathaniel Rochester

The permanent collection includes more than 500 objects from the collections of four generations of the Sibley and Watson families.

Community involvement

Besides hosting exhibitions, classes, and educational programs, the Gallery puts on such major events as the biennial Rochester-Finger Lakes Exhibition and the annual Clothesline Festival.

The Rochester-Finger Lakes Exhibition is a biennial competition for artwork from New York's 27 westernmost counties.  It is judged by guest jurors, which have included Charles E. Burchfield, John Bauer, former director of the Whitney Museum of American Art, and Thomas Messer, former director of the Solomon R. Guggenheim Museum.  Past winners include Wendell Castle, Albert Paley, Honoré Sharrer, Hans Christensen, Bill Stewart, Graham Marks, and Kathy Calderwood.  It grew out of the Rochester Art Club's annual members-only exhibitions which were held in the Gallery starting in 1914, and became a separate event in 1938 under its current name.
The Clothesline Festival is an open-air exhibition where visitors buy artwork directly from New York state exhibitors and enjoy live entertainment and family activities.  The Gallery reluctantly initiated the Festival as an unjuried show in 1957, and the Festival has consistently proved a crowd-pleaser as well as a means to bolster the Gallery's budget.

Facilities

See also
 List of university art museums and galleries in New York State

References

External links

Art museums and galleries in New York (state)
Institutions accredited by the American Alliance of Museums
Art museums established in 1913
Museums in Rochester, New York
University museums in New York (state)
University of Rochester
1913 establishments in New York (state)
University art museums and galleries in New York (state)